Sir Henry Winston Barron, 1st Baronet DL (15 October 1795 – 19 April 1872) was an Irish baronet and politician, who stood at nine different general elections.

Background
Born at Ballymil in County Waterford, he was the son of Pierce Barron and his wife Anna, only daughter of Henry Winston. His younger brother was the bishop Edward Barron. Barron was educated at Trinity College, Dublin.

Career
He entered the British House of Commons for Waterford City in 1832, however he lost his seat in the general election of 1841. In October of the same year, he was created a baronet, of Bellevue, in the County of Kilkenny. A year later, both representatives for the constituency were unseated and Barron was returned to parliament until 1847. He was re-elected in 1848, sitting for the next four years. Barron was again successful in the general election of 1865 and represented Waterford City until 1868. Although he won the constituency's by-election in the following year, the result was declared void because of bribery in 1870. Barron served as High Sheriff of County Waterford for 1858 and also as a justice of the peace and a deputy lieutenant of the county.

Family
On 1 May 1822, he married Anna Leigh Grey, the only daughter of Sir Gregory Page-Turner, Fourth Baronet and had by her a daughter and a son. She died in 1852, and Barron married secondly Augusta Anna, youngest daughter of Lord Charles Somerset at St George's, Hanover Square on 1 August 1863. This marriage was childless. Barron died aged 76 in 1872 and was buried at Ferrybank, Waterford. He was succeeded in the baronetcy by his son, Henry. His second wife survived her husband for nine years.

Works
Notes on Education in Germany and Holland; (1840)

References

External links

1795 births
1872 deaths
Alumni of Trinity College Dublin
Baronets in the Baronetage of the United Kingdom
Deputy Lieutenants of Waterford
Members of the Parliament of the United Kingdom for County Waterford constituencies (1801–1922)
UK MPs 1832–1835
UK MPs 1835–1837
UK MPs 1837–1841
UK MPs 1841–1847
UK MPs 1847–1852
UK MPs 1865–1868
UK MPs 1868–1874
High Sheriffs of County Waterford
Irish Repeal Association MPs